Connors is a surname. Notable people with the surname include:
Alanna Connors (1956–2013), Hong Kong-born American astronomer and statistician
Andree Connors, poet and novelist
Bill Connors, jazz musician
Bill Connors (baseball), baseball player and executive
Bobby Connors, ice hockey player
Buck Connors, American actor
Carol Connors (disambiguation), several people
Christopher J. Connors, American politician
Chuck Connors, American actor
Daniel Connors, Australian rules footballer
Edward G. Connors, American bar owner and gang associate
Graeme Connors, Australian country music singer
James Connors (disambiguation), including Jimmy Connors
Jimmy Connors, American tennis player
Joe Connors, 19th century baseball player
Joseph Connors, American art historian
John Connors, Irish recipient of the Victoria Cross
Kevin Connors, ESPNews anchor
L. Joseph Connors, American politicians
Leonard T. Connors, American politician
Loren Mazzacane Connors, American musician
Mark Connors, Australian rugby union footballer
Merv Connors, American baseball player
Mike Connors (1925–2017), American actor
Noel Connors, Irish athlete
Norman Connors, American jazz drummer
Robert Connors, American football player
Ronald Gerard Connors, American-born Catholic Bishop of San Juan de la Maguana, Dominican Republic
Rose Connors, mystery fiction author
Scruff Connors, Canadian radio broadcaster
Stompin' Tom Connors (1936–2013), Canadian folk singer
Connors or Conners, surname of at least eight people arrested in England as part of Operation Netwing

Fictional characters
Curt Connors, alter ego of Spider-Man villain, the Lizard
Billy Connors, son of Curt Connors
Max Connors in the Australian TV series SeaChange
Faith Connors, the main protagonist of the 2008 video game Mirror's Edge
Blackie Connors, an Irish Traveller on the Irish TV series Glenroe (1983–2001)
Phil Connors in the film Groundhog Day, a weatherman trapped in time, played by Bill Murray
Ruth Connors, one of the main characters in the novel The Lovely Bones by Alice Sebold

See also
Conners
Connor (surname)